Bloodstain or blood stain may refer to:

Blood residue, common bloodstains
Bloodstain pattern analysis, one of several specialties in the field of forensic science
Bloodstain (Souls series), a game mechanic used in the Souls series of video games
"Bloodstain", a song by UNKLE from the 1998 album Psyence Fiction
"Bloodstain", the alternative name for "Shirt" (song) by SZA from the 2022 album SOS
Bloodstain, a webcomic series by Linda Lukšić Šejić

Bloodstained or Blood Stained may refer to:
Bloodstained (series), a series of dark fantasy video games
"Blood Stained", a Judas Priest song from the album Jugulator
Blood Stained: When No One Comes Looking, a biography; see David Edward Maust#In popular media
"bloodstains", a song by experimental duo 100 gecs

See also

Blood (disambiguation)
Stain (disambiguation)